Iain McCaig (born March 19, 1957) is an American artist, writer, and filmmaker.  He was involved in the Star Wars franchise and many other iconic film and book projects, including an album cover for Jethro Tull's Broadsword and the Beast.

Biography
McCaig was born in Santa Monica, California, but spent most of his younger years in Victoria, British Columbia, Canada. He later moved to Great Britain and attended the Glasgow School of Art, but returned one summer to California to work at Korty Films, where he contributed to Sesame Street cartoons and a  trailer for the 1983 animated film Twice Upon a Time.

Returning to the UK, he began a career as a freelance illustrator; his work there includes the cover for Jethro Tull's (The Broadsword and the Beast), the design of the Games Workshop logo and cover and interior illustrations for Ian Livingstone's 'Fighting Fantasy' books.  In 1990, he returned to California to work for Industrial Light and Magic and later for Lucasfilm.  During that time, he directed his first professional film, a 1998 short called The Face, which won multiple awards, including the Year 2000 Notable Video from the American Library Association.

In film, McCaig is best known for designing the Star Wars characters Padmé Amidala and Darth Maul and has contributed key designs to many of the films in the Star Wars franchise, including Episodes I, II, III, and VII. At a 2016 speaking engagement at Academy of Art University, McCaig revealed that the original plan for Padmé's character was for her to almost kill Anakin Skywalker to start a galactic revolution. This part of the script was changed by the film's writer, George Lucas.

Among his other credits are Terminator 2, Hook, Interview with the Vampire, Bram Stoker's Dracula, Charlotte's Web, Peter Pan, Harry Potter and the Goblet of Fire, The Spiderwick Chronicles, John Carter of Mars, The Avengers, Guardians of the Galaxy, and The Jungle Book.  He was also Co-Producer and Concept Design Director on Outlander.

In October 2008, a book of McCaig's work, Shadowline: The Art of Iain McCaig, was released. The book is a combination of mini-art classes, an allegorical novella on McCaig's creative process, and a retrospective of 28 years of his film and personal work.

McCaig has taught drawing and storytelling publicly and privately for most of his career. He is the author of four DVDs on Visual Storytelling and Concept Design for the Gnomon Workshop.  In 2014, McCaig received the Spectrum Award for Grand Master.

McCaig's daughter, Mishi is also a film artist, having contributed to Iron Man, Outlander and John Carter of Mars, as well as producing her own short film work.  Iain and Mishi were both involved in the production of the Discovery Channel series Dinosaur Revolution.  His son, Inigo, is also an artist.

McCaig currently lives in Victoria, British Columbia, with his wife, Leonor.

References

External links

The Gnomon Workshop
Artist Interview With Iain McCaig
Iain McCaig: The Art Of Visual Storytelling
The Art of Iain McCaig

1957 births
Alumni of the Glasgow School of Art
American illustrators
Canadian illustrators
Fighting Fantasy
Game artists
Living people
Fantasy artists
American speculative fiction artists
American production designers
American directors
American storyboard artists